Peckoltia oligospila is a species of catfish in the family Loricariidae. It is a freshwater fish native to South America, where it occurs in the lower Amazon River basin in Brazil. The species reaches 10.5 cm (4.1 inches) SL. It appears in the aquarium trade, where it is typically referred to either by its associated L-number, which is L-006, or as the brown-dot peckoltia.

References 

Fish described in 1864
Ancistrini